The 2017–18 Sheffield Shield season was the 116th season of the Sheffield Shield, the domestic first-class cricket competition in Australia. It started on 26 October 2017 and finished on 27 March 2018. The opening round of matches were played as day/night fixtures and the first three rounds of matches took place before the Ashes series. Victoria were the defending champions.

In round two of the competition, Mitchell Starc became the first bowler to take a hat-trick in each innings of a first-class cricket match in Australia. He became the second Australian, and the eighth bowler overall, to do so in a first-class match.

In the final round of fixtures, Tasmania beat the defending champions, Victoria, by 156 runs to advance to their first Sheffield Shield final since the 2012–13 season. They faced Queensland at Allan Border Field in Brisbane. In the final, Queensland beat Tasmania by nine wickets to win their eighth title and their first since 2012. This was also the final season for Doug Bollinger, Ed Cowan, Ben Cutting and Michael Klinger.

Points table

Round-Robin stage

Round 1

Round 2

Round 3

Round 4

Round 5

Round 6

Round 7

Round 8

Round 9

Round 10

Final

Squads

New South Wales
New South Wales named the following squad for 2017-18. Players with international caps are listed in bold.

Queensland
Queensland named the following squad for 2017-18. Players with international caps are listed in bold.

South Australia
 
South Australia named the following squad for 2017-18. Players with international caps are listed in bold.

Tasmania
 
Tasmania named the following squad for 2017-18. Players with international caps are listed in bold.

Victoria
Victoria named the following squad for 2017-18.  Players with international caps are listed in bold.

Western Australia
 
Western Australia named the following squad for 2017-18.  Players with international caps are listed in bold.

Debutants
The following players made their first-class debuts throughout the competition.

Broadcasting
All Sheffield Shield matches were exclusively streamed live and free on Cricket Australia's official website, with the final broadcast live on ABC Grandstand radio.

References

External links
 Series home at ESPN Cricinfo

Sheffield Shield
Sheffield Shield
Sheffield Shield seasons